Miguel Fenelon Câmara Filho (4 April 1925 – 28 June 2018) was a Brazilian Catholic archbishop.

Câmara Filho was born in Brazil and was ordained to the priesthood in 1948. He served as auxiliary bishop of the Roman Catholic Archdiocese of Fortaleza, Brazil, and titular bishop of AthTruim, from 1970 to 1974. Câmara Filho then served as coadjutor of the Roman Catholic Archdiocese of Maceio, Brazil, from 1974 to 1976 and as archbishop of the archdiocese from 1976 to 1984. Finally Câmara Filho served as archbishop of the Roman Catholic Archdiocese of Teresina, Brazil from 1986 to 2001.

Notes

1925 births
2018 deaths
20th-century Roman Catholic archbishops in Brazil
Roman Catholic bishops of Fortaleza
Roman Catholic archbishops of Maceió
Roman Catholic archbishops of Teresina